David Charles McLellan (born July 27, 1973) is a former competitive swimmer in the long-distance freestyle events, who represented Canada at the 1992 Summer Olympics in Barcelona, Spain.  There he finished in 23rd position in the 1500-metre freestyle.

As an active member of the London (Ontario) Aquatic Club, David has been recognized for his achievements by the LAC by having his name placed on the Wall of Fame and also holds club records in the following events:

 15/17 Boys 1500 Freestyle (25M / Short Course) 15:09.52 (1991)
 Open Mens 400 Freestyle (25M / Short Course) 3:52.04 (1992)
 Open Mens 800 Freestyle (25M / Short Course) 7:54.02 (1992)
 Open Mens 800 Freestyle (50M / Long Course) 8:08.39 (1992)
 Open Mens 1500 Freestyle (25M / Short Course) 15:08.17 (1992)

In addition to his lustrous swimming career, David is currently the Chief Executive, Financial and Operating Officer (CEO, CFO, COO) for the GDLS Wednesday Hockey League (WHL) which plays out of the Western Fair District Sports Complex and is based in London, Ontario.

See also

 List of University of Georgia people

References

 Canadian Olympic Committee
 London Aquatic Club

1973 births
Canadian male freestyle swimmers
Georgia Bulldogs men's swimmers
Living people
Olympic swimmers of Canada
Swimmers at the 1992 Summer Olympics
Swimmers from London, Ontario